Picturing Tolkien: Essays on Peter Jackson's 'The Lord of the Rings' Film Trilogy is a 2011 collection of essays on Peter Jackson's 2001–2003 film representation of J. R. R. Tolkien's 1954–1955 fantasy, The Lord of the Rings. It is edited by Janice M. Bogstad and Philip E. Kaveny. 

The book contains analyses by scholars of film and of literature of Peter Jackson's interpretation of The Lord of the Rings from multiple points of view. Reviewers, noting that the decade elapsed since the films appeared gave the authors some perspective on the films after the initial heated debate, found the collection interesting, measured, and worthwhile both for scholars and for Tolkien fans.

Context 

J. R. R. Tolkien (1892–1973) was an English Roman Catholic writer, poet, philologist, and academic, best known as the author of the high fantasy works The Hobbit and The Lord of the Rings.

Tolkien's book The Lord of the Rings was published in 1954–1955; it was awarded the International Fantasy Award in 1957. The publication of the Ace Books and Ballantine paperbacks in the United States helped it to become immensely popular with a new generation in the 1960s. It has remained so ever since, judged by both sales and reader surveys. The literary establishment was largely hostile to the book, attacking it in numerous reviews.

Peter Jackson's film series was released as three films between 2001 and 2003. The budget was $281 million, and together the three films grossed over $2.9 billion worldwide. The series runs for 9 hours, 18 minutes in the "theatrical" or cinema version, and 11 hours, 26 minutes in the extended version released on DVD. Although long for a film trilogy, this was short compared to Tolkien's work, presenting the films' makers with a major challenge of abridgement, compression, and transformation for the production of the series. Both scholars and fans were deeply divided on how well the films manage to represent the spirit of the book, from feeling that it had been lost, to granting that some elements were lost but others suitably substituted, to seeing the films as a remarkable cinematic tribute to Tolkien.

Contents 

 Janice M. Bogstad and Philip E. Kaveny: "Introduction"

 I. Techniques of Story and Structure

 Kristin Thompson: "Gollum Talks to Himself"
 Verlyn Flieger: "Sometimes One Word Is Worth a Thousand Pictures"
 John D. Rateliff: "Two Kinds of Absence"
 E. L. Risden: "Tolkien's Resistance to Linearity"
 Dimitra Fimi: "Filming Folklore"
 Yvette Kisor: "Making the Connection on Page and Screen in Tolkien's and Jackson's The Lord of the Rings"
 Sharin Schroeder: "It's Alive. Tolkien's Monster on the Screen"
 Robert C. Woosnam-Savage: "The Materiel of Middle-Earth"

 II. Techniques of Character and Culture

 Judy Ann Ford and Robin Anne Reid: "Into the West"
 Philip E. Kaveny: "Frodo Lives but Gollum Redeems the Blood of Kings"
 Brian D. Walter: "The Grey Pilgrim"
 Janet Brennan Croft: "Jackson's Aragorn and the American Superhero Monomyth"
 Richard C. West: "Neither the Shadow Nor the Twilight"
 Janice M. Bogstad: "Concerning Horses"
 Michael D. C. Drout: "The Rohirrim, the Anglo-Saxons, and the Problem of Appendix F"
 Joseph Ricke and Catherine Barnett: "Filming the Numinous"

Publication history 

Picturing Tolkien was published by McFarland & Company in paperback in 2011.

Reception 

Anne Petty, reviewing the book for Tolkien Studies, writes that its ten-years-on timeframe from the appearance of Jackson's films enabled its authors to take "more measured and thoughtful" points of view after the "heated" early debate on the merits of "Jackson versus Tolkien". She describes the essays as "a fascinating cross-section of opinion— and expert knowledge—on this monumental visual retelling of Tolkien's Middle-earth saga", with "compelling arguments on both sides". In her opinion, the book is well-balanced in content; it offers fresh points of view; and the individual essays are clear and reasoned. The book starts off with Kristin Thompson's essay, forming "the strongest film defense", and then Verlyn Flieger's, "the strongest book defense". In Petty's view, this works well, enabling the reader to evaluate all the other essays on a scale from Jackson's total success to total failure. She notes that Thompson "cleverly" makes heavy use of the "gold standard" Tolkien scholar Tom Shippey, while Flieger argues tersely in her short essay that CGI fantasy film is quite unsuited to representing anything so language-based as Tolkien's work. She concludes that the book will not "radically change the minds" of people who (like Petty) feel that Jackson "played too fast and loose" with Tolkien, but writes that the collection contains "much to be appreciated".

Emily Auger, in Mythlore, writes that some of the essays, like Dimitra Fimi's on folklore, or Flieger's, John D. Rateliff's, or Thompson's, offer new perspectives on "issues familiar to Tolkien fans and scholars", such as what a Balrog looks like, or why Tom Bombadil was omitted from the films. She calls Fimi's essay "well-articulated", distinguishing "between folklore in film, 'that is, the use of myth, tale types, legend ... in films' and 'folklore about film ... including popular legends and stories about these media, as well as fan ethnography or 'the folklore of audiences'." Auger writes that Fimi likens Jackson's willingness to listen to fans to Tolkien's "keen awareness and study of myth and legend". In Auger's view, the whole collection is of interest both to fans and to scholars, and despite the book's film-oriented objective, is "worthwhile" even for those readers "most dedicated to Tolkien in the original".

The Tolkien scholar Carol A. Leibiger notes Tolkien's documented skepticism that fantasy writing could work as drama, and comments that Thompson in her essay states that critics have mirrored his views with respect to Jackson's films. She notes among the contributions that two professors of English, E. L. Risden and Yvette Kisor, have both explored how well Jackson handles Tolkien's complex interlacing of multiple narrative threads. Risden shows how Jackson makes the story linear, flattening out the asides, and describes what is lost by doing that, such as Tolkien's "exploration of good and evil". Kisor examines how Jackson used "filmic techniques (intercutting, visual doubling, and voice-over) to render Tolkien's interlace techniques and to replicate the connections among interrelated strands of the story." Liebiger states, without comment, that Kisor believes that Jackson managed to create similar emotional effects and cover similar themes to Tolkien. Liebiger finds Robert Woosnam-Savage's "expert commentary" (he is curator of England's Royal Armouries Museum in Leeds) on the craftsmanship involved in creating the weapons and armour "an interesting anomaly" among the scholarly talk of the other essays in the first section of the book, calling it "a welcome addition". In the book's second section, she notes that both Brian D. Walter and Janet Brennan Croft consider the differences between Tolkien's and Jackson's Gandalf, in interestingly different ways. Walter sees Jackson's Gandalf as "reduced and indecisive", offering the heroes Frodo and Aragorn "greater autonomy, where Tolkien's Gandalf is "powerful, authoritative, yet elusive". Croft sees Tolkien's Gandalf as "conservative" and "authoritarian", while the heroes are "reworked" from being satisfyingly idealised to "'low mimetic' film heroes with whom viewers might identify". The result, Leibiger writes, may have been to make Jackson's Gandalf less appealing to audiences than Tolkien's. She is less complimentary about the two editors' own essays which she finds inaccurate, wordy, poorly-written and sometimes vague. Leibiger commends the editors "for providing a venue for nuanced, interdisciplinary approaches to Jackson's adaptations."

References

Sources 

 "

2011 non-fiction books
Tolkien studies
Film criticism